Nina Kovacheva, (born 1960, Sofia, Bulgaria) is a French-Bulgarian artist. She lives and works in France.

Biography 
Kovacheva was born in Sofia, Bulgaria. She studied at the National Academy of Fine Arts Sofia, graduated in 1985. Her works cover the fields of photography, drawing, painting, objects, video and video installations. Her artistic career also includes a fruitful cooperation with Valentin Stefanoff, her spouse, especially with video and video installations in public and museum spaces. For the installation 'In the Out', shown at the 4th Biennial of Contemporary Art 2002 in Cetinje, Montenegro, Kovacheva and Stefanoff were awarded the UNESCO annual prize for art.

Selected solo exhibitions
 2020 'Paradise is temporarily closed, God', Kultum, Graz, Austria
 2019 H2O / 2H2O, 359 Gallery, Sofia, Bulgaria
 2018 , Sofia - Arsenal, Museum of Contemporary Art, Sofia, Bulgaria,
 2018 0 for Black 1 for White, Sofia City Art Gallery, Sofia, Bulgaria 
 2017 , National Gallery of Macedonia, Skopje, Macedonia
 2015 The Marriage of Heaven and Hell, MAMC, Musee d'Art Modern et Contemporain, Saint Étienne, France
 2016 Gold and Niles, galerie Heike Curtze, Vienna, Austria 
 2012 The Crying Game, Galerie Heike Curtze, Vienna, Austria
 2012 Physics and Metaphysics of the Dark Spot, Arosita Gallery, Sofia, Bulgaria,
 2010 Surplus Enjoyment, Museum of Contemporary Art Taipei, Taiwan 
 2008 Au-delà de ce qui est visible, MNAC National Museum of Contemorary Art, Bucharest, Romania
 2006 Play for Two Hands and Black, video installation on the facade of Academy of Fine Arts, Sofia, Bulgaria 
 2005 Phases of Accumulation and Extraction in a Limited Space, National Art Gallery, Sofia, Bulgaria,

Selected group exhibitions

Collections 
NINA Kovacheva's works are included in the following permanent collections: Bibliothèque Nationale de France, Musée d'art moderne (Saint-Étienne) France,  Victoria and Albert Museum, London, Albertina collection, Vienna, Esterhazy Foundation Austria, Dom Museum Vienna, Kulturzentrum bei den Minoriten Collection Graz Austria, European Investment Bank Luxembourg, National Art Gallery, Bulgaria, The City Art Gallery Sofia.

References

Bibliography 
 Martine Dancer-Mourès, FAGE editions, 2015. NINA Kovacheva The Marriage of Heaven and Hell . 
 Surplus Enjoyment, 2015. .
 The Crying Game, 2012
 Aging Pride , 
 LENTOS Kunstmuseum Linz, Ludwig Museum - Museum of Contemporary Art Budapest The Naked Man, 2012 .
 Intrigantes Incertitudes  
 Micro-narratives 
 Family Matters   
 Gott hat kein no museums has got religion in Art in Early 21st Century 
 Arte in centro Europa, page 132, Biblioteca d'arte contemporanea Silvana Editoriale
 Art China, Vol 2 page 63

External links
 
 Galerie Heike Curtze
 Atelier le Grand Village

1960 births
Living people
Bulgarian artists
Bulgarian women painters
Interdisciplinary artists